After the end of World War II, the Central Labour Camp in Potulice became a detention centre for Germans and anti-communist Poles. It was set up by the Soviet and Polish Communist authorities in Potulice in place of the former Nazi German Potulice concentration camp (known as the Ostjugendbewahrlager Potulitz or Lebrechtsdorf camp), the subcamp of Stutthof built in 1941. Following liberation by the Red Army, the camp was controlled by the Soviet NKVD Department of Prisoners and Internees until June 1945. Repopulated, it remained in operation until 1949 under the management of the Stalinist Ministry of Public Security of Poland.

Camp operation
A total of 34,932 people were imprisoned in the camp between 1945 and 1949. At first, the inmates were mainly "ethnic Germans" from the Volksliste (DVL) including some prisoners-of-war, but also women, and 1,285 children – most of them orphaned. The prisoners worked in several workshops on premises as well as in nearby farms owned by the camp administration (with the total area of 1,174.60 ha), between 6.30 a.m. and 17.30 p.m., with one hour break. Over time, they included fighters from the Armia Krajowa (Home Army) and prisoners of war from the Czech Republic, Hungary and Romania. Reported 2,915 inmates died from typhus and dysentery. It was the result of epidemic conditions prevailing in the camp, and the lack of medical care. The dead were buried in the mass graves. Other sources emphasize the total number of prisoners who died there since the inception of the camp in 1941 under the German administration, amounting roughly to 5,000 victims including Poles, Belarusians, Jews and Germans.

In 1950/1951, during the darkest years of Stalinist terror the camp was transformed into a prison for Polish political prisoners. Following the 1961 renovations and the subsequent replacement of barracks with cement structures, it became a prison mainly for criminal offenders. In 1974 a wall was erected around the perimeter. Today, the Penal Unit in Potulice is a state prison with space for 1,446 inmates (underaged, and first-time offenders, as well as criminally insane) featuring a medical clinic.

Remembrance
During the communist rule in the People's Republic of Poland, the memory of post-war events and the human rights abuses in the camp, was censored. Only after the Revolutions of 1989 could this issue be brought into the public debate. Nowadays, close to the memorial to the Nazi camp of Potulice, another memorial was built in 2000 to the post-war labour camp for Germans in Stalinist Poland. The remembrance to both camps brings both German and Polish historical perceptions closer.

See also
List of concentration and internment camps
Potulice concentration camp (Lebrechtsdorf Potulitz)
Zgoda labour camp
Central Labour Camp Jaworzno

Notes and references

 Information about documentary film "Casus Potulice"
 Information about Potulice prison. Miesięcznik Forum Penitencjarne monthly (ibidem).
 Polski Gułag (Polish Gulag). Wprost weekly newsmagazine, issue 12/2002 (1008), March 24, 2002
One place - two memories. Double remembrance in Potulice, (ibidem).

Forced migration
Aftermath of World War II in Poland
Internment camps
Soviet World War II crimes in Poland
Stalinism in Poland